Coppong Daeng Rannu (1920 in Gowa, South Sulawesi – 2 June 2010) is a master of Makassar ethnic-group dances. She is best known as Rice Goddess in performance I La Galigo.

Life

She began learning dance when she was 10 years old, continued her family’s dancing-tradition. She was moved to become a dancer by her mother's words, "if you don’t learn to dance, then there are no one in our family who could carry on our dancing-generation."  She learned dancing from her grandfather, Mosoa Daeng Olla, who taught her Pakarena and Salonreng. Pakarena is a dance performed in palace by 3 dancers, and salonreng is a ritual dance performed in certain events, such as in warding off misfortune ceremonies. She may be the only one who able to perform the near-extinct Salonreng.

She debuted as palace dancer of Balla Lompoa, Gowa Royal Palace. 
For a three-month period in 2004, she performed for I La Galigo across Singapore, Europe, US, and Australia.

She died on 2 June 2010 from asthma at 89.

Awards

 In 1999, received award from Indonesian tourism, arts and cultural minister
 In 2000, received award from South Sulawesi Culture Foundation
 In 2004, received award from Robert Wilson (director) in performance of I La Galigo

Resources
 Translated from KOMPAS with some edits, Empu Tari Kuno Makassar - Saturday,  April 28, 2007. Retrieved on May 1, 2007.
 https://translate.google.com.au/translate?hl=en&sl=id&u=http://bukan-tokohindonesia.blogspot.com/2009/06/coppong-daeng-rannu-empu-tari-kuno.html&prev=search
 https://www.pressreader.com/indonesia/the-jakarta-post/20100608/282333971148646
 http://gaycitynews.nyc/gcn_430/ponderousmusical.html
 http://www.performanceparadigm.net/index.php/journal/article/viewFile/41/42
 http://ro.uow.edu.au/cgi/viewcontent.cgi?article=1181&context=creartspapers
 https://ich.unesco.org/doc/src/NGO-90223-ICH-09.pdf

References

External links
 https://web.archive.org/web/20070929133211/http://www.kompas.com/kompas-cetak/0704/28/Sosok/3465609.htm (Indonesian)
 https://archive.today/20040528221004/http://www.changeperformingarts.it/Wilson/galigo_credits.html

1920 births
2010 deaths
Bugis people
Respiratory disease deaths in Indonesia
Deaths from asthma
People from Makassar